KUB or KUBS or Kub or Kubs may refer to:

2K12 Kub, a Soviet mobile surface-to-air missile system
Kubb, a Swedish lawn game with wooden blocks
Kidneys, ureters, and bladder, a medical imaging technique
Scania K UB, low-entry citybus chassis
KUB, a ZALA Aero Group military UAV